Decianus is the name of several ancient Romans, including:

C. Appuleius Decianus, tribune of the plebs in 98 BC
Catus Decianus, the procurator of Roman Britain in 61 AD who created the conditions for Boudica's revolt

Decianus is also the Latin form of the Italian name Deciano or Deciani:
Tiberio Deciani, Italian jurist and humanist (1509–1582)